Hŏch'ŏn County is a county in South Hamgyŏng province, North Korea.  It was created after the division of Korea, from portions of Tanch'ŏn and P'ungsan.

Geography
Most of the county is steep and mountainous, particularly in the southeast. There are numerous high peaks. The Pujŏllyŏng and Kŏmdŏk Mountains (검덕산맥) pass through the county, with the highest peak at Kŏmdŏksan.

The chief stream is the Namdaech'ŏn.  Approximately 90% of the county is forestland.

Administrative divisions
Hŏch'ŏn county is divided into 1 ŭp (town), 5 rodongjagu (workers' districts) and 17 ri (villages):

Economy
Mining and electrical power are the chief local industries. There are deposits of copper, iron ore, lead, and zinc.  Local crops include maize, soybeans, and potatoes, but cultivation is difficult due to the mountainous terrain.

Sangnong mine is located in this county, to the west of Sangnong-rodongjagu.

Transportation
Hŏch'ŏn county is served by the Hŏch'ŏn and Mandŏk lines of the Korean State Railway, and by various roads.

Near Sangnong-rodongjagu, there is a trolleybus line to Sangnong mine served by one vehicle, though there were two vehicles in 2002. However, in more recent satellite imagery from 2020, the only trolleybus visible has disappeared.

Military
The Sangnam-ri Ballistic Missile Base is located in the county. According to the Center for Strategic and International Studies, the existence of the base first came to public light in 1999, although construction began ca. 1994. Primary construction of barracks, underground facilities, bunkers, and other support structures was completed by the mid-2000s. Sangnam-ri is a battalion- or regiment-sized unit that encompasses approximately 3.85 sq. km of mountainous territory. It is operated by the Korean People's Army Strategic Force and is equipped with Hwasong-10 (Musudan) intermediate-range ballistic missiles.

See also
Geography of North Korea
Administrative divisions of North Korea
South Hamgyong

References

External links

Counties of South Hamgyong